La La Land is a 2016 American romantic musical comedy-drama film written and directed by Damien Chazelle. Starring Ryan Gosling and Emma Stone, the film focuses on two young people struggling to make ends meet in Los Angeles, while pursuing their dreams as artists. Justin Hurwitz composed the film's musical score, while Linus Sandgren was the cinematographer. David and Sandy Reynolds-Wasco were responsible for the production design and Mary Zophres designed the costumes.

La La Land premiered at the 73rd Venice International Film Festival on August 31, 2016, where Stone won the Volpi Cup Award for Best Actress. The film had a limited release on December 9, 2016 in Los Angeles and New York City, before expanding wider starting December 16. The film was successful at the box office, earning over $430 million against its $30 million budget. Rotten Tomatoes, a review aggregator, surveyed 425 reviews and judged 91% to be positive. The film has been nominated for 265 awards, winning 112; its direction, screenplay, music and the performances of Gosling and Stone have received the most attention from award groups.

La La Land received 14 nominations at the 89th Academy Awards tying records for most nominations by a single film with All About Eve (1950) and Titanic (1997). It won six, Best Director (Chazelle), Best Actress (Stone), Best Cinematography (Sandgren), Best Original Score (Hurwitz), Best Original Song ("City of Stars"), and Best Production Design (the Wascos). At the ceremony, the film was also incorrectly announced as the winner for Best Picture (which it lost to Moonlight) after the presenters had been given the wrong envelope, and Chazelle became the youngest winner of the Best Director award. The film garnered a leading seven Golden Globe Award nominations—Best Motion Picture – Musical or Comedy, Best Director, Best Actor – Musical or Comedy for Gosling, Best Actress – Musical or Comedy, Best Screenplay, Best Original Score, and Best Original Song ("City of Stars"). Winning all of its nominations, it became the film with the most Golden Globe Awards.

La La Land also led the 70th British Academy Film Awards with five wins and 11 nominations. It won for Best Film, Best Actress in a Leading Role, Best Direction, Best Cinematography, and Best Film Music. At the 23rd Screen Actors Guild Awards, both Stone and Gosling were nominated for their leading roles, with Stone winning for Lead Actress. At the 22nd Critics' Choice Awards, the film was nominated for 12 awards. It won eight, including Best Picture, Best Director, and Best Score. The film's soundtrack won Best Compilation Soundtrack for Visual Media and Best Score Soundtrack for Visual Media at the 60th Annual Grammy Awards. In addition, the American Film Institute selected La La Land as one of its ten films of the year.

Accolades

Notes

References

External links 
 

La La Land